Ken McGregor and Frank Sedgman successfully defended their title, defeating Vic Seixas and Eric Sturgess in the final, 6–3, 7–5, 6–4 to win the gentlemen's doubles tennis title at the 1952 Wimbledon Championship.

Seeds

  Ken McGregor /  Frank Sedgman (champions)
  Gardnar Mulloy /  Dick Savitt (third round)
  Jaroslav Drobný /  Budge Patty (semifinals)
  Vic Seixas /  Eric Sturgess (final)

Draw

Finals

Top half

Section 1

Section 2

Bottom half

Section 3

Section 4

References

External links

Men's Doubles
Wimbledon Championship by year – Men's doubles